The SP-350 Denise, famous as the "Diving saucer" (Soucoupe plongeante), is a small submarine designed to hold two people, and is capable of exploring depths of up to . It was invented by Jacques-Yves Cousteau and engineer Jean Mollard at the French Centre for Undersea Research.  It was built in the year 1959 and usually operated from Cousteau's ship, the Calypso.

Diving Saucer Specifications
Denises propulsion consists of steerable, electrically powered water jets, allowing it to navigate in all directions, as well as turn about its vertical axis. To correct the attitude of the hull, the pilot can shift a liquid mercury ballast mass. The crew members enter the craft through a hatch on the top of the hull and lie prone side-by-side on mattresses to operate it, watching their surroundings through tilted portholes that let them come within a few centimeters of their subject. Electric lamps are fitted for night diving and to provide illumination for photography at extreme working depths.  An electrically operated manipulator arm can be fitted at the front of the craft so that the craft can pick up objects for the crew to examine through the portholes.

Denise is naturally positively buoyant, and is weighted to negative buoyancy with ballast weights that can be jettisoned in an emergency. If the craft is within  of the surface, the crew can abandon it via the top hatch, provided they are equipped with emergency breathing apparatus.

Launching and recovery is accomplished with the assistance of a shipboard crane.

Use

The vehicle was featured in Costeau's film Le Monde sans soleil ("World Without Sun")

Denise was used by Jacques Cousteau in 1976 to explore the wreck of the HMHS Britannic.

See also 
 Deep Star 4000, another submersible designed by Cousteau

References

 

 

Research submarines of France
1959 ships
Jacques Cousteau